Catolaccus grandis is a parasitic wasp native to southeastern Mexico. It was introduced to the United States in the 1970s.

Its natural hosts are the boll weevil (Anthonomus grandis) and the closely related Anthonomus hunteri. Its predation of the boll weevil, an economically significant pest of cotton, has led to its use as a biological control in the United States.

References

External links 
 Catolaccus grandis (Burks). Cornell University. Accessed 2011-11-08.
 Catolaccus grandis. Encyclopedia of Life. Accessed 2011-11-08.

Pteromalidae
Hymenoptera of North America
Biological pest control wasps
Insects described in 1954